Polobaya District is one of twenty-nine districts of the province Arequipa in Peru. The village of Chapi with the sanctuary of Our Lady of Chapi is located in this district.

References

Districts of the Arequipa Province
Districts of the Arequipa Region